Weilerswist is a municipality in the district of Euskirchen in the state of North Rhine-Westphalia, Germany. It is located in the Eifel hills, approximately 10 kilometers north of Euskirchen, and 20 kilometers south-west of Cologne.

References 

Municipalities in North Rhine-Westphalia
Euskirchen (district)